The Ministry of Local Administration (Arabic: وزارة الإدارة المحلية ) is a cabinet ministry of Yemen.

List of ministers 

 Hussein Abdulrahman al-Aghbari (17 December 2020 – present)

See also 
Politics of Yemen

References 

Government ministries of Yemen